Dancing With Mermaids is the second novel by the English writer Miles Gibson. The novel includes elements of magic realism and erotica.

Plot
The novel is set in the secluded fishing village of Rams Horn, once a fashionable Regency spa, at the mouth of the River Sheep, somewhere on the Dorset coast. Rams Horn is described by the author as ‘a memory, a lost cause, a carnival of ghosts, an ark of half-forgotten dreams’. The Financial Times described the setting as a secretive place ‘full of leery, venal, outsize, hideous and beautiful people’  .

Publication History
First published by William Heinemann, London, 1985. . First US edition published by EP Dutton 1986. Reprinted in the UK by the Do Not Press 1997.

Reception
The New Yorker described the novel as ‘a wild, funny, poetic exhalation that sparkles and hoots and flies’.

References

Novels by Miles Gibson
1985 British novels
Novels set in Dorset
Heinemann (publisher) books